Yaacob bin Ibrahim (born 3 October 1955) is a Singaporean former politician who served as Minister-in-charge of Muslim Affairs between 2002 and 2018, Minister for Community Development, Youth and Sports between 2002 and 2004, Minister for the Environment and Water Resources between 2004 and 2011, Minister for Communications and Information between 2011 and 2018, and Minister-in-charge of Cyber Security between 2015 and 2018. A member of the governing People's Action Party (PAP), he was the Member of Parliament (MP) representing the Kolam Ayer division of Jalan Besar GRC between 1997 and 2020.

Education
Yaacob attended Tanjong Katong Technical Secondary School (now Tanjong Katong Secondary School).

He graduated from the University of Singapore (now National University of Singapore) with a bachelor's degree with honours in civil engineering in 1980. He subsequently went on to obtained a PhD at Stanford University in 1989.

Career

Academia career
Yacoob started his career as a postdoc at Cornell University. He returned to Singapore in 1990 and joined the National University of Singapore in 1991.

He received his department's teaching excellence award in 1994. He is currently on leave of absence from the university as an associate professor.

Political career
Yacoob made his political debut in the 1997 general election as part of the five-member PAP team contesting in Jalan Besar GRC and won. He was elected as the Member of Parliament representing the Kolam Ayer ward of Jalan Besar GRC between 1997 and 2011 and later Moulmein–Kallang GRC between 2011 and 2020.

In April 2001, he was appointed as the first Mayor of Central Singapore District, a role he served until November 2001.

Yaacob was Parliamentary Secretary for Communications and Information Technology and later Senior Parliamentary Secretary. He became Minister of State for Community Development and Sports in November 2001. In March 2002, Yaacob became the Acting Minister for Community Development and Sports and Minister-in-charge of Muslim Affairs and was made a full Cabinet minister in May 2003.

He became Minister of Environment and Water Resources in 2004. In 2009, after the Bukit Timah canal burst its banks after a downpour, resulting in parts of Bukit Timah being submerged, Yaacob remarked it was a freak event that "occurs once in 50 years".

During the 2006 general election, Yaacob was part of the five-member PAP team contesting in Jalan Besar GRC and won 69.26% of the vote against the Singapore Democratic Alliance.

During the 2011 general election, Yaacob was part of the four-member PAP team contesting Moulmein–Kallang GRC and won 58.55% of the vote against the Workers' Party.

In May 2011, as part of a Cabinet reshuffle, Yaacob became Minister for Information, Communication and the Arts. He continued to serve as the Minister-in-charge of Muslim Affairs. Yaacob is also the vice-chairman of the party's Central Executive Committee (CEC).

During the 2015 general election, Yaacob was part of the four-member PAP team contesting in Jalan Besar GRC and won 67.75% of the vote against the Workers' Party. In April 2015, Yaacob was appointed as Minister-inacharge of Cyber Security and oversees the Cyber Security Agency (CSA), an agency formed under the Prime Minister's Office (PMO).

In 2017, Yaacob declined competing in the 2017 presidential election and preferred to do policy work.

Yaacob stepped down from the cabinet on 30 April 2018. After the 13th Parliament was dissolved on 23 June 2020, Yaacob retired from politics, ending his political career after 23 years of service.

Personal life
Yaacob has been active in community service since his school days and has been involved with the Association of Muslim Professionals, Jamiyah, Majlis Ugama Islam Singapura and the Nature Society. Initially a volunteer tutor, he became Chairman of the Council for the Development of Singapore Malay/Muslim Community (Yayasan Mendaki) in March 2002.

He is married with a son and a daughter. Questions arose in regards to his son's citizenship and if he would serve National Service were raised when a leaked US diplomatic cable from WikiLeaks stated the minister's two children as US citizens. In response, he clarified that his children have dual American and Singapore citizenship until the age of 18 because of the status of his wife as an American citizen. He confirms his son will serve national service.

Yaacob's eldest brother Ismail Ibrahim was the first Malay recipient of the President's Scholarship. His sister Zuraidah Ibrahim was a former Straits Times journalist now with South China Morning Post. His younger brother Latiff Ibrahim is a lawyer.

References

External links

Members of the Cabinet of Singapore
Members of the Parliament of Singapore
People's Action Party politicians
Environment ministers of Singapore
Singaporean engineers
Stanford University alumni
University of Singapore alumni
Academic staff of the National University of Singapore
Singaporean people of Malay descent
Singaporean Muslims
1955 births
Living people
Communications ministers of Singapore